This is a list of a few of the carracks and galleons that served under the Spanish Crowns in the period 1410-1639; note that Castile and Aragon were separate nations, brought together in 1474 only through a unified Trastamaran and subsequently Habsburg monarchy, but each retaining its own governments and naval forces until the 18th century. From 1580 to 1640 Portugal was also part of this Habsburg Empire, but again its naval forces remained separate and are not included below. Not all these ships listed were built in Spain or its colonies:

Galleons
 Santa Clara - Captured by England c. 1413, renamed Holyghost de la Tour
 San Felipe (carrack) - Captured by England 1587
 Santiago el Mayor (c. 1584)
 San Martin 48
 San Francisco 52
 Santa Ana 47
 Santa Ana 30
 Trinidad Valencera 22
 Nuestra Senora del Pilar 11
 Santa Cruz 18
 San Juan de Gargoriu 16
 La Lavia 30
 Santiago el Mayor 24
 Santa Maria de Gracia 26
 La Juliana (32) 
 San Juan el Menor 24
 San Cristobal 36
 Santiago 25
 Manuela 12
 Maria Juan 24
 San Juan 21
 Magdalena 18
 Concepcion de Zubelzu 16
 Caridad Inglesa 12
 Trinidad 24
 San Pedro 24
 Santa Maria de la Rosa 26
 San Esteban (1607 shipwreck) 26
 San Salvador 25
 Nuestra Señora de la Visitación - Former English galleon Dainty, captured by the Spaniards in the action of San Mateo Bay in 1594.
 Nuestra Señora de Begoña 24
 S. S. Medel y Celedon 24
 Santa Barbara 12
 S. Buenaventura 21
 San Juan Baptista (c. 1628)
 Santiago (c. 1628)
 San Juan Bautista (1635)
 San Agustín (1635)
 Santo Domingo de Guzman (1635)
 Nuestra Senora de Iclar (1635)
 San Juan Bautista (1635)
 San Antonio de Padua (1635)
 San Tomás de Aquino (c. 1638)
 San Agustín (c. 1638)
 San Ambrosio (c. 1638)
 San Gerónimo (c. 1638)
 Santo Cristo de Burgos (c. 1638)
 La Visitación de Nuestra Señora (c. 1639)
 Nuestra Señora de la O (c. 1639)
 La Natividad de Nuestra Señora (c. 1639)
 La Concepción (c. 1639)
 Nuestra Señora de la Purificatión (c. 1639)
 La Salutación de la Virgen (c. 1639)
 León Coronado - Former French galleon Lion Couronné, captured by the Spaniards in 1651.

The term galeón continued in use in Spanish sources for much longer than in the navies of Northern Europe, lasting even into the middle of the eighteenth century. However, the design of the capital ship had evolved during the second half of the 17th century, when (like other maritime states) when they had in reality adopted the concept of the ship of the line.

References 
 Goodman, David, Spanish naval power, 1589-1665 (Cambridge University Press, 1997) 
 Guilmartin Jr, John F., Galleons and Galleys (Cassell & Co, 2002) 
 Konstam, Angus, Spanish Galleon, 1530-1690 (Osprey Publishing, 2004) 
 Phillips, Carla Rahn, Six Galleons for the King of Spain: Imperial Defense in the Early Seventeenth Century.

See also
 List of battleships of Spain
 List of ships of the line of Spain
 List of Spanish sail frigates

Age of Sail ships of Spain
Galleons
Spain
Galleons